This Picture may refer to:

 This Picture (band), an English alternative rock band
 "This Picture" (song), a 2003 single by Placebo